Al-Urwa or Al-Urwah (The Bond) may refer to:

 Al-Urwah al-Wuthqa, 19th-century pan-Islamic journal.
 Al-Urwah al-Wuthqa (book), a Shi'i book of Islamic jurisprudence.
 Al-Urwa, a US propaganda magazine published in the 1950s.

See also
 Urwa (disambiguation)